Maciste and Prisoner 51 is a 1923 German silent action film directed by Luigi Romano Borgnetto and starring Bartolomeo Pagano, Karl Beckersachs and Karl Falkenberg. It was one of several German films featuring the Italian peplum hero Maciste.

Cast
 Bartolomeo Pagano as Maciste
 Karl Beckersachs
 Karl Falkenberg
 Leopold von Ledebur

References

Bibliography
 Roy Kinnard & Tony Crnkovich. Italian Sword and Sandal Films, 1908–1990. McFarland, 2017.

External links

1923 films
Films of the Weimar Republic
German silent feature films
Films directed by Luigi Romano Borgnetto
German black-and-white films
1920s action films
German action films
Maciste films
Silent adventure films
1920s German films